The men's tournament of basketball at the 1996 Olympics at Atlanta, United States, began on July 20 and ended on August 4, when the United States defeated FR Yugoslavia 95–69 for the gold medal.

Participants

 (Host)

Format
 Twelve teams are split into 2 preliminary round groups of 6 teams each. The top 4 teams from each group qualify for the knockout stage.
 Fifth and sixth-placed teams from each group are ranked 9th–12th in two additional matches.
 In the quarterfinals, the matchups are as follows: A1 vs. B4, A2 vs. B3, A3 vs. B2 and A4 vs. B1.
The eliminated teams at the quarterfinals are ranked 5th–8th in two additional matches.
 The winning teams from the quarterfinals meet in the semifinals as follows: A3/B2 vs. A1/B4 and A2/B3 vs. A4/B1.
 The winning teams from the semifinals dispute the gold medal. The losing teams dispute the bronze.

Ties are broken via the following the criteria, with the first option used first, all the way down to the last option:
 Head to head results
 Goal average (not the goal difference) between the tied teams
 Goal average of the tied teams for all teams in its group

Squads

Preliminary round

Group A

Group B

Tournament bracket

Quarterfinals
All times are local (UTC−5)

Classification round

Placement Matches (9–12th Place)

11th–12th

9th–10th

Placement Matches (5–8th Place)

7th–8th

5th–6th

Semifinals

Finals

Bronze Medal match

Gold Medal match

Awards

Final standings

See also
 Women's Tournament

References

1996 Olympic Games: Tournament for Men, FIBA Archive. Accessed December 22, 2016.

External links
Basketball at the 1996 Summer Olympics – Men's basketball at Sports Reference

 
Basketball at the 1996 Summer Olympics
Basketball at the Summer Olympics – Men's tournament